
Gmina Krościenko Wyżne is a rural gmina (administrative district) in Krosno County, Subcarpathian Voivodeship, in south-eastern Poland.

Villages
The gmina contains the villages (sołectwos) of Krościenko Wyżne and Pustyny.

Neighbouring gminas
Gmina Krościenko Wyżne is bordered by the city of Krosno and by the gminas of Haczów, Korczyna and Miejsce Piastowe.

References
Polish official population figures 2006

Kroscienko Wyzne
Krosno County